The Walk is a 2015 American 3D biographical drama film directed by Robert Zemeckis and written by him and Christopher Browne.. It is based on the story of 24-year-old French high-wire artist Philippe Petit's walk between the Twin Towers of the World Trade Center on August 7, 1974. The film stars Joseph Gordon-Levitt as Petit, alongside Ben Kingsley, Charlotte Le Bon, James Badge Dale, Ben Schwartz, and Steve Valentine.

The film was released by TriStar Pictures on September 30, 2015 in the United States in IMAX 3D, and on October 9 in regular 2D and 3D. It received positive reviews from critics, with praise for Gordon-Levitt's performance, Zemeckis' direction and the visual effects, particularly during the wire walk scene, but underperformed at the box office. The film was dedicated to the victims of the September 11 attacks.

Plot

In 1968, Parisian street performer Philippe Petit bites a hard candy from the audience, damaging his tooth. In the dentist's waiting room, he sees a photo of the Twin Towers in a magazine. Analyzing it, he dreams of walking a tightrope between the towers. Meanwhile, he is evicted from his parent's house by his father, who disapproves of his job. Philippe returns to the circus that inspired him to wire walk as a child and practices in the big top after hours. He is caught by Papa Rudy, whom he impresses with his juggling skills. Philippe asks Papa Rudy for tips and advice on knot tying and rope rigging, which Papa Rudy agrees to for compensation.

While performing one day, Philippe meets Annie, a fellow street performer, and they begin a romantic relationship. Annie supports him on his dream and finds him the perfect place to practice: her music school. Meeting Jean-Louis, a photographer, they become friends, and he, the official photographer and second accomplice in his dream. Jean-Louis introduces Jeff, another accomplice with fear of heights, to Philippe and Annie. He explains his idea to use a bow and an arrow tied to a fishing line to get the cable across the Towers. After failing his first real performance by falling into a lake due to anxiety, Philippe walks between Notre Dame Cathedral's towers in Paris to redeem himself. He succeeds with Jean-Louis' support and is arrested in the process, though he receives universal applause and international attention.

Philippe and Annie travel to America, setting a date for the walk as August 6, 1974. He disguises himself to spy and scout out the locations, impaling his foot on a nail in the process. At one point, he meets a fan of Philippe's, seeing him at Notre Dame: Barry Greenhouse, a life insurance salesman who works in the building, who becomes another team member. They also meet French-bilingual electronics salesman J.P., amateur photographer Albert, and stoner David. The team goes over the plan several times, deciding Philippe must be on the wire before the construction crews arrive at 7:00 a.m.

On the eve of the event, the team encounters several challenges: being three hours behind schedule, guards on the premises, and nearly dropping the heavy cable off the roof. However, they successfully string up the ropes and set the wires. Philippe begins his walk, explaining that everything around him faded once he started, except the wire and himself, and that for the first time in his life, he felt genuinely thankful and at peace. He successfully crosses the gap between the towers while crowds below cheer him on. Once reaching the other building, he has an urge to return, so he walks back again across the void. At one point, he kneels to his audience and even lies down. The police arrive and threaten to remove him by helicopter if he does not get off. But Philippe relentlessly continues to walk back and forth until he achieves the feat a total of six times in his 45-minute performance and feels confident enough to showboat on occasion before complying. He is arrested on site, with the police and construction workers commending him on his bravery.

Philippe and his accomplices are released, and he decides to stay in New York, but Annie chooses to follow her music dream in Paris. Philippe explains that the building manager gave him a free pass to the observation decks of the towers with the expiry date crossed out and replaced with "forever".

Cast
 Joseph Gordon-Levitt as Philippe Petit
 Charlotte Le Bon as Annie Allix
 Ben Kingsley as Papa Rudy
 Clément Sibony as Jean-Louis
 James Badge Dale as Jean-Pierre
 César Domboy as Jeff
 Ben Schwartz as Albert
 Benedict Samuel as David
 Steve Valentine as Barry Greenhouse

Production
On January 23, 2014, it was announced that Robert Zemeckis would direct a film based on the story of Philippe Petit's walk between the Twin Towers of the World Trade Center in 1974. It was also confirmed that Zemeckis wanted Joseph Gordon-Levitt to star in the film as Petit. Zemeckis first came across the story of Petit from the children's book The Man Who Walked Between the Towers. At first, Zemeckis questioned whether or not the story was true as he did not recall the event, saying he "somehow missed it." Zemeckis immediately recognized the potential for a movie, telling Deadline: "To me, it had everything that you want in a movie. It had an interesting character who’s driven, and obsessed, and passionate. It had all this caper stuff. He was an outlaw. There was suspense. And then he did this death-defying thing." By February 2014, Gordon-Levitt was confirmed to star in the film. In April 2014, Charlotte Le Bon, Ben Kingsley and James Badge Dale joined the cast of the film. On May 6, 2014, it was announced that the film would be released on October 2, 2015. In May 2014, Steve Valentine and Ben Schwartz joined the cast of the film. Principal photography began on May 26, 2014, in Montreal, and ended on August 6, 2014.

Gordon-Levitt, who had no formal high-wire experience, trained directly with Petit. By the end of the eighth day, he was able to walk on the wire by himself, and continued to practice while shooting. To learn more about what it was like, Gordon-Levitt also walked the distance between the World Trade Center memorial's two pools, which are located where the Twin Towers stood before the September 11 attacks. He visited the original observatory once before, in 2001, during his first summer in New York City. "It was touristy but I wanted to go do it. I remember it distinctly. It felt more like being in the sky than being on a tall building." Aside from wire-walking, Gordon-Levitt also learned to speak French fluently, perfecting a Parisian accent aided by Le Bon and other French actors on set.

Release
The film premiered at the New York Film Festival on September 26, 2015. It had an early release in IMAX on September 30, 2015, before a wide theatrical release on October 9, 2015.

Reception

Box office
The Walk grossed $10.1 million in North America and $51 million in other territories for a worldwide total of $61.2 million, against a budget of $35 million.

The film was released into IMAX theaters on Wednesday, September 30, 2015. In the opening weekend of its limited release, the film grossed $1.6 million, finishing 11th at the box office. During the first weekend of its wide release a week later, the film grossed $3.7 million, coming in seventh.

Critical response
The Walk received positive reviews from critics, with praise for Gordon-Levitt's performance, Zemeckis' direction and the visual effects, particularly during the wire walk scene. On Rotten Tomatoes the film has a rating of 83%, based on 277 reviews, with an average rating of 7.1/10. The site's critical consensus reads, "The Walk attempts a tricky balancing act between thrilling visuals and fact-based drama – and like its wire-walking protagonist, pulls it off with impressive élan." On Metacritic, the film has a score of 70 out of 100, based on 41 critics, indicating "generally favorable reviews". On CinemaScore, audiences gave the film an average grade of "A−" on an A+ to F scale, while 72% of PostTrak audiences said that the film was excellent or good.

John Lasser of IGN gave the film an 8.6 out of 10 'great' score, saying, "The Walk is an amazing film, and is so on multiple levels. Joseph Gordon-Levitt puts forth such an easy charm crossed with a fierce determination that it is impossible not to fall in love with Philippe Petit as he attempts what sounds utterly suicidal. The planning and set up of the caper are as fun as any heist movie. And, even though everyone watching knows exactly what the film is building towards, the climactic sequence delivers everything you want and more." Peter Debruge of Variety gave the film a positive review, saying "A filmmaker with a gift for overcoming the seemingly impossible puts audiences in the place of the man who walked between the Twin Towers in this gripping human-interest story." David Rooney of The Hollywood Reporter gave the film a positive review, saying "The film's payoff more than compensates for a lumbering setup, laden with cloying voiceover narration and strained whimsy." Michael Phillips of the Chicago Tribune gave the film two and a half stars out of four, saying "The film gets better as it goes, and the last half-hour (especially in 3-D on an Imax screen) is nearly everything it should be: scary, visually momentous, meticulously realized." Lou Lumenick of the New York Post gave the film three out of four stars, saying "Zemeckis finally delivers the goods in abundance in the section that really counts: A vertigo-inducing digital re-creation of Petit's famous walk back and forth between the towers."

Ann Hornaday of The Washington Post gave the film two and a half stars out of four, saying "The Walk satisfies as an absorbing yarn of authority-flouting adventure and as an example of stomach-flipping you-are-there-ness. The journey it offers viewers doesn't just span 140 feet, but also an ethereal, now-vanished, world." Peter Travers of Rolling Stone gave the film three out of four stars, saying "Expect the worst from the first half- that's before Philippe Petit (Joseph Gordon-Levitt) strings up a wire between the World Trade Center towers. But then, oh, baby, does this movie fly." Richard Roeper of the Chicago Sun-Times gave the film three out of four stars, saying "The last 30 minutes or so are all about the walk. Dariusz Wolski's cinematography is beautiful... and Gordon-Levitt does some of his best acting when he's out on the wire and mostly silent, his face glowing from the sheer crazy joy he's feeling." James Berardinelli of ReelViews gave the film three out of four stars, saying "It's two-thirds of a great film but the slow start and unremarkable first hour hold it back. Still, for those who buy into the precept that good things are worth waiting for, The Walk unquestionably delivers." Brian Truitt of USA Today gave the film two and a half stars out of four, saying "For those who want to feel like they're 110 stories up and living in the clouds, Hollywood does its job conjuring movie magic with a breathtaking Walk to remember."

Accolades

See also
 The Man Who Walked Between the Towers (2003 book), picture book depicting the crossing
 Man on Wire (2008 film), documentary biopic film about the crossing

References

External links
 
 
 
 

2015 films
2010s English-language films
2010s French-language films
2015 3D films
2015 biographical drama films
American biographical films
American biographical drama films
Drama films based on actual events
Films scored by Alan Silvestri
Films directed by Robert Zemeckis
Films set in 1974
Films set in New York City
Films set in Manhattan
Films set in Paris
Films shot in Montreal
IMAX films
Films using motion capture
Films with screenplays by Robert Zemeckis
World Trade Center
ImageMovers films
TriStar Pictures films
Tightrope walking
2015 drama films
2015 multilingual films
American multilingual films
Films produced by Robert Zemeckis
2010s American films